Bbonhel Bala is a populated place in Khairpur District, Sindh, Pakistan.

See also
Aror
Sukkur

References

Populated places in Khairpur District